Michalis Vlachos (born 20 September 1967) is a Greek former professional footballer who played as a defender.

Vlachos began his career with Apollon Smyrni, where he was called up for a debut with the Greece national football team in 1989. He later represented both Olympiakos and AEK, they winning the Greek championship with the latter. During the 1994–95 season, Vlachos appeared for AEK in the UEFA Champions League, scoring in a 1–3 loss to Casino Salzburg in the group stage.

In 1998, Vlachos joined English First Division club Portsmouth, for whom he made over 50 league appearances as a midfielder and sweeper in two years. He joined Walsall in February 2000, making 12 appearances for the club prior to relegation in May of the same year.

Vlachos returned to Greece in the summer of 2000, joining Ionikos. He finished his career with his first club Apollon, retiring in 2003.

Honours
Olympiacos
Greek Cup: 1992
Greek Super Cup: 1992

AEK Athens
Greek Championship: 1994
Greek Cup: 1996, 1997
Greek Super Cup: 1996

References

1967 births
Living people
Greece international footballers
Association football defenders
Super League Greece players
AEK Athens F.C. players
Apollon Smyrnis F.C. players
Olympiacos F.C. players
Ionikos F.C. players
Portsmouth F.C. players
Walsall F.C. players
AEK F.C. non-playing staff
Footballers from Athens
Greek footballers